Chalgan (also Romanized as Chalgān and Chalegān; also known as Chālekān, Chālīān, and Chalpan) is a village in Taham Rural District, in the Central District of Zanjan County, Zanjan Province, Iran. At the 2006 census, its population was 413, in 86 families.

References 

Populated places in Zanjan County